Miracle at Midnight is an American TV movie based on the rescue of the Danish Jews in Denmark during the Holocaust. It is a Disney production and premiered on ABC on May 17, 1998.

Plot 

Set in Denmark during September 27 - October 3, 1943, Miracle at Midnight is a dramatization of the true story of the Danish rescue of Jews from deportation to Nazi concentration camps. 
Doctor Karl (Sam Waterston) and Doris (Mia Farrow) Koster are a Christian couple living in Copenhagen with their two children, 18-year-old Henrik (Justin Whalin) and preteen Else (Nicola Mycroft).

As Chief Surgeon of Christiana Hospital, Doctor Karl Koster initially uses his position to protect a young resistance fighter shot by the Nazis. Meanwhile, Henrik is secretly working for the same group, commandeering weapons sent to the Nazis.

On Wednesday, September 29, 1943 (three years into the occupation), Doctor Koster learns of the imminent arrest of the Danish Jews on midnight Friday (the beginning of Rosh Hashanah) from a former government minister, who had been alerted by German maritime attache Georg Duckwitz. The Kosters start by hiding Rabbi Ben Abrams and his family, but soon realize they can help more Jews and become an integral part of an effort to transport over 7,000 Jews to neutral Sweden.

Doctor Koster, his family, the hospital staff and the majority of residents work with the resistance to save the Danish Jews from deportation to the Theresienstadt concentration camp. From hiding them in their own homes to admitting them as patients under Christian names, to even hiding them in the morgue. As Doctor Koster declares, "In every language and religion, to be humane is to love your neighbor." 

Henrik and his friend load up a truckload of Jews, planning to drive them to the coast from whence they'll be taken to safety in Sweden. En route, they are stopped by German Nazi officials who tell Henrik to open the back of the truck. When the Nazis find Jews, Henrik's friend runs and hides in the woods, and gets help from Henrik's father, who springs Henrik, but Henrik's friend is killed while distracting the Germans.

First they find hiding places for the Jews to survive the initial raids, and then work with the Swedish government and local fishermen to transport them to safety. Meanwhile, Henrik secures trucks and other transport to get people to the coast. They discover that one of the fishermen that was helping them transport Jews was a traitor and tried to turn them in to the Germans. This results in them almost getting caught by the descending SS, but the resistance fighters are able to show up in time and provide cover for the remaining boat to get away.
 
Finally, the Kosters themselves have to flee when the Nazis discover their activity. Doris Koster is captured by the Nazis, but the rest manage to escape to Sweden. Doris is questioned by the Nazis and released two years later and the family reunites (the reunion is not shown in the film, but is mentioned).

Cast
 Sam Waterston as Dr. Karl Koster
 Mia Farrow as Doris Koster
 Justin Whalin as Henrik Koster
 Patrick Malahide as Georg Duckwitz
 Andrew Scott as Michael Grunbaum
 Halina Froudist as Ruth Abrams
 Daisy Beaumont as Hannah Abrams
 Eva Birthistle as Karin

Production notes 
The film opens with a map of Nazi-occupied Europe in 1943. The map includes numerous errors. Austria is not displayed as an incorporated part of Germany. Yugoslavia shows its current division into independent republics. East Prussia is not shown; the Kaliningrad enclave appears instead.

Notes 
 First aired: Sunday, May 17
 As part of the Wonderful World of Disney Classroom Edition series, Miracle at Midnight has a website with a range of supporting educational materials,

See also 
List of Holocaust films
List of World War II films

External links

Holocaust films
Jewish Danish history
Films set in Denmark
Films set in the Baltic Sea  
Films set in 1943
1998 television films
1998 films  
1990s American films
Disney television films
Films directed by Ken Cameron